Ove Bertil Sellberg (born 15 October 1959) is a Swedish professional golfer who played on the European Tour. He was the first Swede to win a European Tour event.

Amateur career
Sellberg was born in Stockholm and began playing golf, 10 years old, at Ågesta Golf Club. At 16 years of age, he lost in the final of the 1976 Swedish Junior Match-play Championship, but won the tournament three years later, when the format was changed to stroke-play.

In 1981, as a 21 year old amateur, he took part in the Spanish Open on the European Tour and finished tied 24th.

He was a member of the tied second-placed Sweden amateur team at the  Eisenhower Trophy in Lausanne, Switzerland, in September 1982, himself finishing tied 6th individually.

Professional career
A sponsor agreement with car manufacturer Saab Automobile made it possible for Sellberg and two of his teammates from the 1982 Eisenhower Trophy, Magnus Persson and Krister Kinell, to turn professional and form Team Saab, granted support and financial possibilities to compete on the European Tour. He successfully progressed through the 1982 European Tour Qualifying School, at La Manga, Spain, in November, finishing tied 5th and earned his first pay check. 

He played on the European Tour through most of the 1980s and 1990s, twice finishing in the top-20 of the Order of Merit, in 1986 and 1987. He won three tournaments on the tour during a five-year-span. 

When he defeated Howard Clark in the final of the 1986 Epson Grand Prix of Europe Match Play Championship at St. Pierre Golf & Country Club in Chepstow, South Wales, Sellberg became the first Swede to win a European Tour event, which earned him the 1986 Swedish Golfer of the Year award, male and female. He had further wins in the 1989 Open Renault de Baleares on Majorca, Spain and the 1990 Peugeot-Trends Belgian Open at Royal Waterloo GC, Belgium.

Sellberg represented Sweden four times in the World Cup, 1983, 1985, 1987 and 1989, with some success. The team finished 11th, 9th, 7th and 3rd, respectively, every time an all-time best for Sweden. In 1987, Sellberg finished tied 7th in the individual competition. He represented Sweden in the Dunhill Cup five years in a row.

In 1984, Sellberg earned Elite Sign No. 72 by the Swedish Golf Federation, on the basis of national team appearances and national championship performances. 

At the opening of the Swedish Golf Museum in June 2000, he was one of ten players, among names such as Annika Sörenstam and Jesper Parnevik, presented as important in the history of Swedish golf.

Sellberg was CEO of PGA Sweden National from 2008 to 2016, running the golf resort south of Bara, east of Malmö, Sweden.

Amateur wins
1979 Swedish Junior Stroke-play Championship
1981 Scandinavian Foursome (Kungsbacka GC) (with Anders Forsbrand)
1982 Guldpokalen (Båstad GC), In Wear-Martinique Open (Kristianstad GC), Ågestakanonen (Ågesta GC)
Sources:

Professional wins (6)

European Tour wins (3)

Swedish Golf Tour wins (2)

Other wins (1)
1983 SAAB Cup (Sweden)

Results in major championships

Note: Sellberg only played in The Open Championship.
CUT = missed the half-way cut
"T" = tied

Team appearances
Amateur
Jacques Léglise Trophy (representing Continent of Europe): 1977 (winners)
European Youths' Team Championship (representing Sweden): 1978, 1979, 1981
EGA Trophy (representing the Continent of Europe): 1978
European Amateur Team Championship (representing Sweden): 1981
Eisenhower Trophy (representing Sweden): 1982

Professional
World Cup (representing Sweden): 1983, 1985, 1987, 1989
Hennessy Cognac Cup (representing Sweden): 1984
Dunhill Cup (representing Sweden): 1986, 1987, 1988, 1989, 1990

References

External links

Profile on golfdata.se 

Swedish male golfers
European Tour golfers
Golfers from Stockholm
Sportspeople from Helsingborg
1959 births
Living people